ABBYY FineReader PDF is an optical character recognition (OCR) application developed by ABBYY, with support for PDF file editing since v15. The program runs under Microsoft Windows 7 or later, and (without PDF editing) Apple macOS 10.12 Sierra or later. The first version was released in 1993.

The program allows the conversion of image documents (photos, scans, PDF files) and screen captures into editable file formats, including Microsoft Word, Microsoft Excel, Microsoft PowerPoint, Rich Text Format, HTML, PDF/A, searchable PDF, CSV and txt (plain text) files. From version 11 files can be saved in the DjVu format. Version 15 supports recognition of text in 192 languages and has a built-in spell check for 48 of them.

FineReader recognizes new characters by: training characters so that they are added to the recognition alphabet; selecting additional characters from a list and adding them to the alphabet of a selected language (for example, adding certain Icelandic characters to a German alphabet for a German text describing Iceland); and adding domain-specific vocabulary to the FineReader’s built-in lexicon. The program also allows users to compare documents, add annotations and comments, and schedule batch processing.

, there were more than 20 million users of ABBYY FineReader worldwide.
Based on FineReader optical character recognition, ABBYY licenses the technology to companies including Fujitsu, Panasonic, Xerox, Plustek and Samsung.

In February 2020, version 15 of the software was rated "Highest-quality OCR on the market" by PC Magazine.

ABBYY 
ABBYY was founded in 1989 and began using its current name in 1997. It is a digital intelligence company that provides document conversion and data capture software, and specializes in OCR technology, intelligent document processing, and process mining. Additional products include FlexiCapture Connector; NeoML, a cross-platform open-source machine learning library; and Vantage, a low-code/no-code AI platform used by banks, insurers, healthcare, and other industries.

ABBYY entered the professional translation market in 2007. It partners with AI, analytics, and RPA vendors UiPath, Blue Prism, Alteryx, PwC India, and others.

In 2019, ABBYY acquired TimelinePI, a process mining company, and Marlin Equity Partners became its biggest shareholder in 2021.

References

External links
 
 Official Linux website 

Optical character recognition software
MacOS graphics-related software
MacOS text-related software
Windows graphics-related software
Windows text-related software
Linux text-related software
Graphics-related software for Linux

PDF software
PDF readers
Desktop publishing software
Automation software